Miyamayomena koraiensis (Korean:벌개미취), commonly called Korean starwort, is a herbaceous perennial plant of the family Asteraceae (Compositae). It can be found in temperate regions, mostly in Korea, in lawns, on roadsides, and other areas with moist soils. Korean starwort is a Korean endemic plant and was first named in the genus Aster in 1909. In Korea, its young leaves are used in food preparation.

Description
Aster koraiensis is a perennial herb. The height is about 50~60 cm. The leaves are green color, alternate, lanceolate and pinnately lobed. They are 12~19 cm length and 1.5~3 cm width of leaves. The main stem grows from rhizome, a horizontal stem of plant that is found underground. The leaves on the roots, radical leaves, fall when flowers begin to open. Leaflike bracts can be found. The flower is bisexual and pale violet color and has an inflorescence head which diameter is about 4~5 cm (Only one flower per stem). The involucre is 13 mm length, and 8 mm diameter and has four lines of involucral scale. The achene has about 4 mm length and 1.3 mm diameter and lanceolate shape. There is no pappus. It blooms from June to September; the fruits (achenes)  mature in November.

Distribution
Miyamayomena koraiensis originated in Korea and also is naturalized throughout Korea peninsula (South Korea and North Korea). It can be easily found anywhere in Korea (around flower gardens, roadsides, mountains, valley, etc.).

Economic value
The characteristic of tenacious hold on life of M. koraiensis makes it possible for massive breeding. The roots are strong to hold on to the ground firmly, and easily grow in most environments, even in barren soil. It has ability to prevent soil runoff so that sometimes these flowers are planted on roadsides, and places where need erosion control.

Origin of the name
In the name Aster koraiensis, 'Aster' means "star" in Greek, and 'koraiensis' means "from Korea". Due to the star shape of flower, it got this name.

In Korea, M. koraiensis is called "Beolgaemichui". 'Beol' means bee in Korean so some people think the name "Beolgaemichui (벌개미취)" came from the belief that bees love this flower.

Language of flowers
In the language of flowers, sometimes called floriography, this flower means "I will never forget the memory, nostalgia, and you."

References

Astereae
Plants described in 1909